The  was a feudal domain in Owari Province, Japan. It was not officially designated as a domain by the Tokugawa Shogunate, when major domains were established, but was finally designated a domain in 1868. The domain was controlled from Inuyama Castle, which is located in present-day Inuyama, Aichi Prefecture.

History
Originally a sub-domain of the Owari Domain, which was ruled by the Tokugawa clan's Owari branch, the Inuyama Domain gained independence when it was recognized in 1868.

Just three years after the Inuyama Domain was officially recognized, the domain system was abolished and the area became Inuyama Prefecture. Three months after that, it was merged into Nagoya Prefecture, which eventually became modern-day Aichi Prefecture.

Leaders
The Inuyama Domain was controlled by three families: Ogasawara, Hiraiwa, and Naruse.

Ogasawara clan
Ogasawara Yoshitsugu
Hiraiwa clan
Hiraiwa Chikayoshi
Naruse clan
Naruse Masanari
Naruse Masatora
Naruse Masachika
Naruse Masayuki
Naruse Masamoto
Naruse Masanori
Naruse Masanaga
Naruse Masazumi
Naruse Masamitsu

See also
Han system
List of Han

Domains of Japan